Shabo (or preferably Chabu; also called Mikeyir) is an endangered language and likely language isolate spoken by about 400 former hunter-gatherers in southwestern Ethiopia, in the westernmost part of the Southern Nations, Nationalities, and People's Region.

It was first reported to be a separate language by Lionel Bender in 1977, based on data gathered by missionary Harvey Hoekstra. A grammar was published in 2015 (Kibebe 2015). Some early treatments classified it as a Nilo-Saharan language (Anbessa & Unseth 1989, Fleming 1991, Blench 2010), but more recent investigation (Kibebe 2015) found none of the grammatical features typical of Nilo-Saharan, and showed that the Nilo-Saharan vocabulary items are loans from Surmic languages (Dimmendaal to appear, Blench 2019).

Demographics
Shabo speakers live in three places in the Keficho Shekicho Zone: Anderaccha, Gecha, and Kaabo.

As they shift from hunting and gathering to more settled agriculture and to working as laborers, many of its speakers are shifting to other neighboring languages, in particular Majang language and Shekkacho (Mocha); its vocabulary is heavily influenced by loanwords from both these languages, particularly Majangir, as well as Amharic.

Classification
Once the many loanwords from its immediate neighbors, Majang and Shakicho, are removed, the wordlists collected show a significant number of Koman words side by side with a larger number of words with no obvious external relationships.  The tentative grammar so far collected offers few obviously convincing external similarities. On this basis, Fleming (1991) has classified Shabo as Nilo-Saharan and, within Nilo-Saharan, as nearest to Koman. Anbessa & Unseth consider it Nilo-Saharan, but present little by way of argument for their position, and no detail on its position within the family. Schnoebelen (2009) in his phylogenetic analysis says that Shabo is best treated as an isolate, but does not exclude the possibility of contradicting evidence gained from applying the comparative method (which still needs to be done); Kibebe (2015) evaluates Schnoebelen as the most rigorous comparison to date. Blench (2010) maintains that Shabo does pattern with the Nilo-Saharan family, and that recent data on Gumuz helped tie the languages together. More recently, Blench (2019) classifies Shabo (Chabu) as a language isolate, noting little evidence for it being part of Nilo-Saharan. 

Blench (2017) lists the following similarities among Shabo, Gumuz, and Koman lexical forms.

The comparison with reconstructed languages of the Surmic and Koman branch as well as three languages from the Gumuz branch shows slight phonological similarity for the first person singular of Proto-Southwest Surmic and the probable ancestor of the Gumuz languages but additional information is lacking and, otherwise, so far it does not seem very approximate.

The number "iŋki" ("one") has been compared to Lowland East Cushitic "tneki" and Saho "inik".

Phonology

The consonants are:

Consonants in parentheses are not entirely phonemic according to Teferra (1995):
  and  occasionally alternate.

Implosive consonants are common in languages of the area, but ejective consonants are not found in Majang.

Consonant length is found in several words, such as walla "goat", kutti "knee"; however, it is often unstable.

Teferra tentatively postulates 9 vowels: , possibly with further distinctions based on advanced tongue root.  Five of these, have long counterparts.  Occasionally final vowels are deleted, shortening medial vowels: e.g. deego or deg "crocodile".

The syllable structure is (C)V(C); all consonants except  and  can occur syllable-finally.

The language is tonal, but its tonology is unclear.  Two minimal pairs are cited by Teferra 1995, including há "kill" versus hà "meat".

Grammar

Syntax
Basic word order is subject–object–verb; there are postpositions rather than  prepositions.

Pronouns
Shabo has an unusually complex pronoun system for Africa:

The pronouns "I" and "he" have been compared to Surmic languages; however, there are also resemblances in the pronouns with the Gumuz languages (Bender 1983).  The gender distinctions made are unusual for Africa.

Verbs
Negation is by adding the particle be after the verb or noun negated: gumu be "(it is) not (a) stick", ʔam be-gea "he will not come" ("come not-?"). Negative forms in b are widespread in Nilo-Saharan and Afro-Asiatic languages.

There appears to be a causative suffix -ka: mawo hoop "water boiled" → upa mawo hoop-ka "(a) man boiled water".

A particle git (infinitive? subjunctive?) marks the verb in constructions with "want": moopa git inɗeet ("sit git want") "I want to sit".

Much of the verbal morphology is uncertain; there appears to be a 3rd person singular future suffix -g- (e.g. inɗage t'a-g "he will eat") and a 2nd person plural suffix -ɗe (e.g. subuk maakɛle kak t'a-ɗe "You (pl.) ate corn", "you-pl. corn past? eat-2nd-pl.")

Nouns
Plurals are optional; when used, they are formed with a word yɛɛro afterwards.

There is a suffix -ka which sometimes mark the direct object, e.g. upa kaan-ik ye "a man saw a dog" ("man dog saw"), but also has many other uses.  A similar suffix is found in many Eastern Sudanic languages, but there it is specifically accusative.

Postpositions
Shabo uses postpositions after nouns, e.g.: upa mana pond ɗɛpik moi "a man sat on a rock" (lit. "man rock on ? sat").

Numbers

Sample sentences
mawo hoop: water boiled
upa mawo hoop-ka: A man boiled water (lit. "man water boiled-caus.")
gumu be: it is not a stick (lit. "stick not".)
ma gumu: it is a stick (lit. "stick ?")
dɛrbakan kaal nu ɗe-be: Derbakan does not have a dog (lit. "Derbakan dog poss.? ?:not")
dɛrbakan kaal nu yaaŋk: Derbakan has a dog (lit. "Derbakan dog poss.? positive?")
ʔam be-gea: he will not come (lit. "come not-?")
inɗigi am-k: he will come (lit. "? come ?")
tin-ta be-ge: he will not eat (lit. "? eat not ?")
inɗage t'a-g: he will eat (lit. "? eat ?")
paar bap: two snakes (lit. "snake two")
upa kaan-ik ye: a man saw a dog (lit. "man dog-obj. saw")
kaan upa-k ye: a dog saw a man (lit. "dog man-obj. saw")
koto upa dɛpik ye: a woman saw a man (lit. "woman man tense? saw")
gom c'uwa t'a: fire burned wood (lit. "fire wood ate")
cu ɗɛpik ibalabiyan-an ɗe (word divisions uncertain): you (pl.) came (lit. "you(pl.) ?:? come-2pl.")
subuk maakɛle kak t'a-ɗe: you (pl.) ate corn (lit. "you(pl.) corn aux? eat-2pl.")
wo ka git inɗeet: I want to drink (lit. "drink ? infin.? want")
moopa git inɗeet: I want to sit (lit. "sit ? infin.? want")
abiyaŋge: they came
upa kakaak jaal kaki ye ʔam: I saw the man who came yesterday (lit. "man came yesterday ? saw ?")
upa mana pond ɗɛpik moi: a man sat on a rock (lit. "man rock on aux.? sat")

See also
Shabo word list (Wiktionary)

References

Bibliography
 Ahland, Colleen, and Roger Blench, "The Classification of Gumuz and Koman Languages", presented at the Language Isolates in Africa workshop, Lyons, December 4, 2010
 Bender, M. Lionel. 1977. "The Surma Language Group - A Preliminary Report". Studies in African Linguistics, Supplement 7. pp. 11–21.
 Roger Blench (2019), 'Chabu and Kadu: two orphan branches of Nilo-Saharan', Proceedings of Vienna Nilo-Saharan meeting
 Gerrit Dimmendaal (to appear) On stable and unstable features in Nilo-Saharan. Nairobi Journal of Languages and Linguistics
 Fleming, Harold C. 1991. "Shabo: presentation of data and preliminary classification", in: M. Lionel Bender (ed.), 1991, Proceedings of the Fourth Nilo-Saharan Conference Bayreuth, Aug. 30.
 Kibebe Tshay Taye. 2015. Documentation and grammatical description of Chabu. Doctoral dissertation, Addis Ababa University.
 Schnoebelen, Tyler. 2009. "(Un)classifying Shabo: phylogenetic methods and results". Peter K. Austin, Oliver Bond, Monik Charette, David Nathan & Peter Sells, eds., Proceedings of Conference on Language Documentation and Linguistic Theory 2. London: SOAS.  (long version, unpublished )
 Schnoebelen, Tyler. 2009. Classifying Shabo. Presentation at the 40th Annual Conference on African Linguistics (ACAL 40), University of Illinois at Urbana-Champaign, April 9–11, 2009.
 Schnoebelen, Tyler. 2010. Shabo is an isolate. "Language Isolates in Africa" workshop, December 3, 2010. Lyon, France.
 Tefera Anbessa and Peter Unseth. 1989. "Toward the classification of Shabo (Mikeyir)." In M. Lionel Bender (ed.), Topics in Nilo-Saharan linguistics, 405-18. Nilo-Saharan, 3. Hamburg: Helmut Buske.   (NISA 3).  (This was the primary source for this article.)
 Tefera Anbessa. 1991. "A Sketch of Shabo Grammar".  in: M. Lionel Bender (ed.), 1991, Proceedings of the Fourth Nilo-Saharan Conference Bayreuth, Aug. 30.
 Teferra Anbessa. 1995. "Brief phonology of Shabo (Mekeyir)". Robert Nicolaï et Franz Rottland, eds., Fifth Nilo-Saharan Linguistics Colloquium. Nice, 24-29 août 1992. Proceedings, pp. 169–193. Köln: Köppe Verlag. Sep. 2, 1989 (Nilo-Saharan 7), Hamburg: Helmut Buske. pp. 29–38.  (Used in this article.)
 Unseth, Peter. 1984. Shabo (Mekeyir). A first discussion of classification and vocabulary. [Unpublished manuscript]

External links
 Red Book of Endangered Languages
 Video presentation by Tyler Schnoebelen on Shabo as an isolate
Shabo basic lexicon at the Global Lexicostatistical Database

 
Language isolates of Africa
Endangered language isolates